DXMR (1170 AM) is a radio station owned and operated by the Philippine Broadcasting Service. Its studios are located at Baliwasan Chico, Zamboanga City. It is the pioneer AM radio station in the province.

References 

Radio stations in Zamboanga City
Radio stations established in 1950
Philippine Broadcasting Service
People's Television Network
News and talk radio stations in the Philippines